Seaboard Coast Line Industries, Inc., incorporated in Delaware on May 9, 1969, was a railroad holding company that owned the Seaboard Coast Line Railroad, its subsidiary Louisville and Nashville Railroad, and several smaller carriers. Its railroad subsidiaries were collectively known as the Family Lines System. Its headquarters were in Jacksonville, Florida, in the United States. Through 1979, the Family Lines network totaled  in 13 states.

The company succeeded SCL Industries, Inc., incorporated August 1, 1968, in Virginia and renamed Seaboard Coast Line Industries, Inc. on February 5, 1969.

On November 1, 1980, Seaboard Coast Line Industries merged with Chessie System, Inc. to form CSX Corporation (Chessie-Seaboard Multiplied), and in 1983 the Family Lines units were combined as the Seaboard System Railroad. In 1986, Seaboard System was renamed CSX Transportation, and then merged with sister CSX Corp. subsidiary Chessie System to form a single new railroad, reporting mark CSXT.

External links 
Atlantic Coast Line and Seaboard Air Line Historical Society website timeline page

Atlantic Coast Line Railroad
Predecessors of CSX Transportation
Seaboard Air Line Railroad
Seaboard System Railroad
Louisville and Nashville Railroad
United States railroad holding companies
Railway companies established in 1969
Railway companies disestablished in 1980
1969 establishments in Delaware
1968 establishments in Delaware